Mihail Sturdza (24 April 1794, Iași – 8 May 1884, Paris), sometimes anglicized as Michael Stourdza, was prince of Moldavia from 1834 to 1849. He was cousin of Roxandra Sturdza and Alexandru Sturdza.

Early life 
He was born as third child and the only son of Grigore Sturdza, Lord of Cozmești, Grand Logothete (1758-1833) and his wife, Princess Maria Callimachi (1762-1822), daughter of Gregory Callimachi, reigning Prince of Moldavia.

Biography 
A man of liberal education, he established in Iași, the Academia Mihăileană, the first University in Romania, a institution of higher education, and the precursor of the University of Iași. He brought scholars from foreign countries to act as teachers, and gave a very powerful stimulus to the educational development of the country. 

In 1844 he decreed the emancipation of the Gypsies, which until then had been treated as slaves and owned by the Church or by private landowners; they had been bought and sold in the open market. Mihail also attempted the secularization of monastic establishments, which was carried out by Prince Alexandru Ioan Cuza in 1864, and the utilization of their endowments for national purposes. 

Mihail quelled the attempted Moldavian Revolution of 1848 without bloodshed by arresting all the few conspirators and expelling them from the country.

Mihail's first wife was Elena Rosetti. His second wife was Princess Smaragda Vogoride, daughter of Stefan Vogoride, Prince of Samos.

He vacationed with his family annually at Baden in Germany. When his and Vogoride's 16-year-old son was killed in Paris there in 1863, he erected a Greek Orthodox church on Michaelsberg to serve as his crypt.

Gallery

See also
 Sturdza family

Notes

References
 

Nobility from Iași
Rulers of Moldavia
Mihail
1795 births
1884 deaths